Teen Love is the debut extended play by noise rock band No Trend, released as a 7" vinyl in 1983 through their very own No Trend Records. It was reissued in 1984 on 12" vinyl, this time including the two extra tracks "Die" and "Let's Go Crazy". It has been described as "a perfect example of No Trend’s ruthless proclivity towards lizard-cold satire". The album cover was drawn by guitarist Frank Price, but it was credited under the pseudonym Jim Jones.

Track listing

7" Version

12" Version

Personnel
Jeff Mentges - Vocals
Frank Price - Guitar, Cover Art
Bob Strasser - Bass
Michael Salkind - Drums (7" only)

References

1983 debut EPs
No Trend albums